Holy Ghost is the third divine person of the Trinity in mainstream Christian theology. Nontrinitarian Christian theologies vary widely in how the Holy Ghost is defined.

Holy Ghost may also refer to:

Religion
 Holy Spirit, a term found in English translations of the Bible, but understood differently among the Abrahamic religions
 Holy Spirit (Islam), referring to the angel Gabriel in the Quran
 Holy Spirit (Judaism), the Spirit of YHWH in the Hebrew Bible (Tanakh) and Jewish writings

Religious orders
 Order of the Holy Ghost, a Roman Catholic religious order, founded by Guy de Montpellier in Provence for the care of the sick by groups of lay people
 Congregation of the Holy Ghost (disambiguation)

Other eponymous institutions
 Church of the Holy Ghost (disambiguation)
 Hospital of the Holy Ghost, Aalborg, a former establishment of the Order of the Holy Ghost in Aalborg, Denmark
 House of the Holy Ghost, Copenhagen, historic building exhibition space by the adjacent Church of the Holy Ghost in Copenhagen, Denmark
 Holy Ghost Seminary, Ypsilanti, Michigan

Music and films
 Holy Ghost (film), a 2014 documentary film on the Holy Spirit's presence in the world
 Holy Ghost!, American electronic music group

Albums
 Holy Ghost: Rare & Unissued Recordings (1962–70) by Albert Ayler
 Holy Ghost! (album), 2011 album by Holy Ghost!
 Holy Ghost (Marc Ford album), 2014
 Holy Ghost (Modern Baseball album), 2016
 Holy Ghost, a 2013 album by Mariposa

Songs
 "Holy Ghost", 1978 song by Bar-Kays
 "Holy Ghost" (White Lies song), 2011
 "Holy Ghost", 2014 song by ASAP Rocky from the album At. Long. Last. ASAP

Ships
, a carrack in service with the English Navigation

See also 
 Holy Spirit (disambiguation)